Harry Draper (1887 – after 1910) was an English professional footballer who played in the Football League for Birmingham.

Draper was born in Chesterfield, Derbyshire. He played local football in Rotherham and spent a season in the Midland League with Rotherham County before joining Birmingham of the Football League Second Division in April 1910. Draper, a playmaker, made three first-team appearances in a struggling side; his debut came on 8 October 1910 in a 3–1 home defeat to Stockport County. He failed to settle, and returned nearer home in September 1911, joining Midland League club Denaby United.

References

1887 births
Footballers from Chesterfield
English footballers
Association football forwards
Rotherham County F.C. players
Birmingham City F.C. players
Denaby United F.C. players
English Football League players
Date of birth missing
Year of death missing
Place of death missing